Gymnothorax elaineheemstrae is a fish in the family Muraenidae.

The eel is named in honor of Elaine Heemstra of the South African Institute for Aquatic Biodiversity.

References

elaineheemstrae
Taxa named by David G. Smith
Fish described in 2020